The 2019 Euroformula Open Championship was a multi-event motor racing championship for single-seat open wheel formula racing cars that held across Europe. The championship features drivers competing in two-litre Formula Three racing cars built by Italian constructor Dallara which conform to the technical regulations, or formula, for the championship. It was the sixth Euroformula Open Championship season.

For the first time since its inception, the championship featured multiple power unit manufacturers, allowing the use of Mercedes and Volkswagen engines. It was intended to have equalised performance of the powerplants, in terms of both power and torque like in the GT3 racing. But the equalisation was not successful as the teams that used Toyota engine which was tuned by Piedrafita had a lack of power in comparison with Mercedes and Volkswagen engines. The situation led to the withdrawal of the teams after the first round and switching to the Mercedes and Volkswagen engine prior round at Spa.

Team Motopark driver Marino Sato won the title after the first race at Barcelona, having won eight races, including series of six wins in row in Spa, Hungaroring and Spielberg, while his team clinched the title after the second Spielberg race. Top rookie Liam Lawson was Sato's closest challenger, winning four races throughout the season. His fellow Red Bull-staplemate Yuki Tsunoda won a race at the Hockenheimring, Teppei Natori was victorious in the second race at Catalunya, Billy Monger became the first double-amputee to win a race in single-seaters when he won the Pau Grand Prix, and Toshiki Oyu won both races at a one-off appearance in Silverstone.

Teams and drivers
All teams utilized a Dallara F317 chassis.

Race calendar and results
An eight-round provisional calendar was revealed on 31 August 2018. The calendar features six circuits from 2018 schedule. While Autódromo do Estoril and Circuito de Jerez are not present in the current version of the calendar, Hockenheim made its debut as a Euroformula Open Championship round. The date of the Spa round was altered on 29 November 2018. On 10 December 2018 was announced that Pau Grand Prix will make debut in the extended nine-round Euroformula Open Championship schedule.

Championship standings

Drivers' championship
Points were awarded as follows:

Only the fifteen best race results counted towards the championship.

Rookies' championship
Points were awarded as follows:

Teams' championship
Points were awarded as follows:

Notes

References

External links
 

Euroformula Open
Euroformula Open
Euroformula Open Championship seasons